Jørgen Anders Bru (5 January 1881 – 17 December 1974) was a Norwegian sport shooter who competed in the 1908 Summer Olympics.

In 1908 he finished sixth with the Norwegian team in the team military rifle event. In the 1000 yard free rifle competition he finished 28th.

References

External links
list of Norwegian sport shooters

1881 births
1974 deaths
Norwegian male sport shooters
ISSF rifle shooters
Olympic shooters of Norway
Shooters at the 1908 Summer Olympics